The Donovan Affair is a 1929 American Pre-Code comedic murder-mystery film directed by Frank Capra. It was produced by Harry Cohn for Columbia Pictures and is based upon the play of the same name by Owen Davis. Its original soundtrack, recorded on soundtrack discs, has been lost, although it has been recreated for live performances.

Plot
After the lights go out at a fancy party, Jack Donovan (John Roche) turns up dead.  Inspector Killian (Jack Holt) is called to the scene.  As part of the investigation, he calls for a re-enactment of the events leading up to the murder.  The lights go out, and another person turns up dead.  Inspector Killian again calls for a re-enactment.

Cast
 Jack Holt as Inspector Killian
 Dorothy Revier as Jean Rankin
 William Collier Jr. as Cornish
 Agnes Ayres as Lydia Rankin
 John Roche as Jack Donovan
 Fred Kelsey as Carney
 Hank Mann as Dr. Lindsey
 Wheeler Oakman as Porter
 Virginia Brown Faire as Mary Mills
 Alphonse Ethier as Captain Peter Rankin
 Edward Hearn as Nelson
 Ethel Wales as Mrs. Lindsey
 John Wallace as Dobbs
 Allan Cavan as Gambler (uncredited)
 Sherry Hall as Gambler (uncredited)

References

External links

The Donovan Affair at silentera.com
Stills at silentfilm.org

1929 films
American black-and-white films
Columbia Pictures films
1920s comedy mystery films
Films directed by Frank Capra
American comedy mystery films
1929 comedy films
1920s American films
1920s English-language films